Bound Brook is a tributary of the Raritan River in Middlesex County, New Jersey, in the United States.

Its name comes from a boundary in an Indian deed.  The stream is referred to as Sacunk, a Native American name meaning "slow sluggish stream", on early maps of the area.

It rises in Edison (near Interstate 287 and County Route 501) and flows through the Dismal Swamp. It then flows through South Plainfield and the Cedar Brook joins it southwest of Spring Lake. It continues through Piscataway into New Market Pond, through Middlesex where it flows into the Green Brook at the northwest corner of Mountain View Park.

It gives its name to the borough of Bound Brook, New Jersey.

Tributaries
Ambrose Brook
Green Brook
Bonygutt Brook
Stony Brook
Blue Brook

See also
List of rivers of New Jersey

References

External links
U.S. Geological Survey: NJ stream gaging stations
1740 Map of the "Indian Purchases"

Rivers of Middlesex County, New Jersey
Tributaries of the Raritan River
Rivers of New Jersey
Bound Brook, New Jersey